Rune Bratseth (born 19 March 1961) is a Norwegian former footballer who played as a sweeper.

Nicknamed Elk due to his stature, he is best known for his spell with Werder Bremen, also having appeared in the 1994 World Cup with Norway.

Club career
Born in Trondheim, Bratseth started his career at local club Rosenborg BK. There, he would only be a part-time professional until he left for Germany's SV Werder Bremen in January 1987, for a mere €93.000. He was immediately cast into the starting XI, making his club debut in a 1–5 loss at 1. FC Nürnberg on 21 February after the winter break; he would also win the first of his two Bundesliga championships in his first full season.

Bratseth's finest moment came when Werder won the UEFA Cup Winners' Cup in 1991–92, in a 2–0 victory against AS Monaco FC. During the campaign he played in eight complete matches out of nine, adding two goals (in both legs against Romania's FCM Bacău).

After a second league title with Bremen, Bratseth began suffering knee problems, even needing injections to play. After only one match in 1994–95 he called it quits at the age of 34, having appeared in 316 games for the Hanseatics all competitions comprised and scored 20 goals. In the 1993–94 UEFA Champions League, he was on the scoresheet at the incredible 5–3 home win over R.S.C. Anderlecht: the Belgians led 3–0 with 25 minutes to go, and he helped to the final comeback with the 2–3.

Bratseth was named Norway's Golden Player – the best Norwegian footballer of the past 50 years by the Norwegian Football Association, in November 2003, to celebrate UEFA's jubilee. Subsequently he became chairman and general manager of Rosenborg, forming a successful partnership with coach Nils Arne Eggen. The club maintained its Norwegian top division superiority in the following years.

Bratseth was actually registered as a player when he started his job at Rosenborg, and since the club did not have 25 players in its first team squad to be registered for the UEFA Champions League, he was included as a backup. Even though he did not want to play, he agreed to sit on the bench for one game in case of "emergency".

He was clocked at 4,69 seconds on the 40 metres sprint, which is one of the fastest times ran by a Norwegian football player.

International career
Bratseth made his debut in the Norway national team on 26 February 1986, playing the first half of a 2–1 friendly win in Grenada. He was a regular in the following eight years, earning a further 59 caps.

During the 1994 FIFA World Cup, 33-year-old Bratseth was captain of the Norwegian squad. As they exited in the group stage (albeit with four points), their third and last game against Republic of Ireland proved to be his last international.

Career statistics

Club

Honours
Rosenborg
1. divisjon: 1985

Werder Bremen
Bundesliga: 1987–88, 1992–93
DFB-Pokal: 1990–91, 1993–94; runner-up: 1988–89, 1989–90
European Cup Winners' Cup: 1991–92

Individual
kicker Bundesliga Team of the Season: 1987–88, 1988–89, 1992–93
Kniksen Award: Kniksen of the year in 1991, 1992, 1994, Kniksen's honour award in 1994
UEFA Norwegian Golden Player: 2003

References

External links

1961 births
Living people
Footballers from Trondheim
Norwegian footballers
Association football defenders
Eliteserien players
Rosenborg BK players
Bundesliga players
SV Werder Bremen players
Norway international footballers
1994 FIFA World Cup players
Norwegian expatriate footballers
Expatriate footballers in Germany
Norwegian expatriate sportspeople in Germany
UEFA Golden Players
Kniksen Award winners
Rosenborg BK non-playing staff
Expatriate footballers in West Germany
Norwegian expatriate sportspeople in West Germany